The 2018 International Challenger Zhangjiagang was a professional tennis tournament played on hard courts. It was the second edition of the tournament which was part of the 2018 ATP Challenger Tour. It took place in Zhangjiagang, China between 3 and 9 September 2018.

Singles main-draw entrants

Seeds

 1 Rankings are as of 27 August 2018.

Other entrants
The following players received wildcards into the singles main draw:
  He Yecong
  Te Rigele
  Wu Yibing
  Zhang Zhizhen

The following players received entry from the qualifying draw:
  Frederico Ferreira Silva
  Dayne Kelly
  Tristan Lamasine
  Yuta Shimizu

The following player received entry as a lucky loser:
  Yusuke Takahashi

Champions

Singles

 Yasutaka Uchiyama def.  Jason Jung 6–2, 6–2.

Doubles

 Gong Maoxin /  Zhang Ze def.  Bradley Mousley /  Akira Santillan walkover.

References

2018 ATP Challenger Tour
2018
Zhang